Tom Kohler-Cadmore (born 19 August 1994) is an English professional cricketer who plays for Yorkshire. He is a right-handed batsman who also bowls right-arm off spin.

Biography
Having come through the Yorkshire age-group system, Kohler-Cadmore  left to complete his education at Malvern College where he was named 2014 Young Wisden Schools Cricketer of the Year. After leaving Malvern College, Kohler-Cadmore made his debut for Worcestershire in August 2013 against a touring Bangladesh A side. On 20 May 2016, at the age of 21, Kohler-Cadmore scored 127 runs from 54 balls for Worcestershire against Durham in the 2016 NatWest t20 Blast. It was the highest individual total for a Worcestershire player in a Twenty20 match.

In June 2017, Yorkshire announced that Kohler-Cadmore had signed a contract of an undisclosed length to rejoin them ahead of the 2018 season. On 8 June 2017, Worcestershire announced that they had mutually agreed to terminate his contract to allow him to immediately join Yorkshire. He had been left out of the previous match.

In May 2019, the England and Wales Cricket Board (ECB) withdrew Kohler-Cadmore from the England Lions' squad, after being named during Alex Hepburn's rape trial. Hepburn was found guilty of rape, and although the judge said that Kohler-Cadmore "did nothing wrong", the ECB were concerned about the disrespectful messages about women that had been exchanged.

On 29 May 2020, Kohler-Cadmore was named in a 55-man group of players to begin training ahead of international fixtures starting in England following the COVID-19 pandemic.

On 1 December 2021, Kohler-Cadmore made the highest individual score in T10 history, scoring 96 off just 39 balls against Bangla Tigers in the Abu Dhabi T10 League. In April 2022, he was bought by the Trent Rockets for the 2022 season of The Hundred.

On 20 June 2022, Kohler-Cadmore agreed a three-year contract with Somerset County Cricket Club ahead of the 2023 season.

References

External links
 

1994 births
English cricketers
Living people
Sportspeople from Chatham, Kent
People educated at Malvern College
Jaffna Kings cricketers
Northern Superchargers cricketers
Peshawar Zalmi cricketers
Quetta Gladiators cricketers
Rangpur Riders cricketers
Trent Rockets cricketers
Worcestershire cricketers
Yorkshire cricketers